Diebiro is a village in the Tiankoura Department of Bougouriba Province in south-western Burkina Faso. The village had an estimated population of 449 in 2005.

References

Populated places in the Sud-Ouest Region (Burkina Faso)
Bougouriba Province